Thomas Furlong (1931 – 16 August 2019) was an Irish Gaelic footballer and hurler who played for club sides Blackrock, St Michael's and Ballinure, at inter-county level with the Cork senior football team and with Munster. He usually lined out in the forwards.

Career
Furlong first came to Gaelic football prominence when he was added to the Cork junior team in 1953. He won a Munster Junior Championship medal that year before later collecting an All-Ireland medal after a defeat of Lancashire. Furlong won a second set or provincial and All-Ireland junior medals in 1955. This success saw him drafted onto the Cork senior team the following year and he won National League and Munster Championship medals in his debut season, however, Cork suffered defeat by Galway in the All-Ireland final. In spite of this, Furlong ended the year with club success by winning a County Junior Championship medal with St. Michael's and a County Senior CHampionship medal with Blackrock. He won a second senior provincial medal with Cork in 1957, however, the ultimate success once again eluded him as Cork were defeated by Louth in the 1957 All-Ireland final. Furlong, who also lined out with the Cork senior hurling team, also earned inclusion on the Munster team. He ended his club career playing with Ballinure.

Death
Furlong died in a nursing home in Ballincollig on 16 August 2019.

Honours
St Michael's
Cork Junior Football Championship: 1956

Blackrock
Cork Senior Hurling Championship: 1956

Cork
Munster Senior Football Championship: 1956, 1957
National Football League: 1955-56
All-Ireland Junior Football Championship: 1953, 1955
Munster Junior Football Championship: 1953, 1955

References

1931 births
2019 deaths
Blackrock National Hurling Club hurlers
Cork inter-county Gaelic footballers
Cork inter-county hurlers
Dual players
Munster inter-provincial Gaelic footballers
St Michael's (Cork) Gaelic footballers